WUEZ (95.1 FM, "95.1 Steve FM") is a radio station  broadcasting an adult hits format. Licensed to Carterville, Illinois, United States, the station serves the Marion-Carbondale (IL) area.  The station is currently owned by Max Media and licensed to MRR License LLC.

History
The station was assigned the call letters WYGF on 1991-02-22.  On 1991-12-27, the station changed its call sign to WEZS, on 1993-09-10 to WXLT, and on 2001-03-19 to the current WUEZ.

On March 20, 2015, WUEZ changed their format from adult contemporary to classic hits, retaining the "Magic 95.1" branding.

On January 4, 2023 WUEZ changed their format from classic hits to adult hits, branded as "95.1 Steve FM".

Ownership
In December 2003, Mississippi River Radio, acting as Max Media LLC (John Trinder, president/COO), reached an agreement to purchase WCIL, WCIL-FM, WJPF, WOOZ-FM, WUEZ, WXLT, KCGQ-FM, KEZS-FM, KGIR, KGKS, KJEZ, KKLR-FM, KLSC, KMAL, KSIM, KWOC, and KZIM from the Zimmer Radio Group (James L. Zimmer, owner). The reported value of this 17 station transaction was $43 million.

Previous logo

References

External links

UEZ
Adult hits radio stations in the United States
Radio stations established in 1991
Max Media radio stations
1991 establishments in Illinois